Well Castle (Dutch: Kasteel Well) is a fully restored 14th century medieval castle located in the Dutch province of Limburg, in the small village of Well, The Netherlands. It is located near the border with Germany, and it is approximately 2  hours southeast of Amsterdam. Kasteel Well itself is made up of two buildings: the Main Castle and the voorburcht, or outer castle. There are two courtyards within Kasteel Well. There are also two moats: an inner and outer moat. These moats once provided protection to the castle and today provide a place to swim for many birds including multiple varieties of ducks, black swans, and geese. Kasteel Well's gardens are available for the public to walk around and admire the grounds. Here there are several well-maintained flower beds, shrubbery, fountains, tower ruins, and trees. From time to time, Kasteel Well's third building, a barn, is used for weddings and other events.

Emerson College obtained Kasteel Well in 1988 and since then has been using it to house students participating in a study abroad program. Over the years since it was obtained by Emerson, they have made several renovations, the latest of which added new rooms bringing the student capacity per semester to around 90 students.

Every fall and spring semester, approximately eighty students from Emerson's Boston, Massachusetts, campus live in and take classes at Kasteel Well. The classes at the castle have a European focus. The program is headed by program director Dulcia Meijers, assisted by Rob Duckers, with Chester Lee serving as Assistant Directors. Students studying at the castle have class a maximum of four days per week (Monday-Thursday) and therefore have three-day weekends for travel. Therefore, as a part of their education, students are given the chance to travel throughout the European continent on those long-weekends and also participate in two mandatory educational excursions with the faculty and staff of Kasteel Well. Of late, the first of these mandatory educational excursions has been to Amsterdam, the capital city of the Netherlands. For several years, due to European Union regulations regarding the duration of stay in the Schengen Region, a third excursion was required. Starting in the Spring semester of 2009 however, Emerson shortened their study abroad program at Kasteel Well to fit 90 days exactly, therefore negating the need for and avoiding the cost of an additional excursion.

List of Mandatory Excursions by Year Old Academic Calendars

References

External links 

 Emerson College Kasteel Well

Gardens in the Netherlands
Castles in Limburg (Netherlands)
Rijksmonuments in Limburg
Bergen, Limburg
Emerson College